Rafael Nadal and Tommy Robredo were the defending champions, but did not participate this year.

Rainer Schüttler and Yen-Hsun Lu won in the final 7–5, 4–6, 7–6(7–4), against Mahesh Bhupathi and Jonas Björkman.

Seeds

Draw

Draw

External links
Draw

2005 Chennai Open
2005 ATP Tour
Maharashtra Open